Krešimir Ivanković (born 13 September 1977) is a Croatian handball player. He currently plays at RK Medvečak in the *Croatian Premier League.

Ivanković is the brother of Vedran Zrnić.

Honours
Badel 1862 Zagreb
Croatian First A League
Winner (3): 1998-99, 1999-00, 2000–01
Croatian Cup
Winner (2): 1999, 2000
EHF Champions League
Finalist (1): 1998-99

Pivovara Laško Celje
Liga Telekom
Winner (1): 2005-06
Slovenian Cup
Winner (1): 2006

HCM Constanța
Liga Națională
Winner 2008-09

Metalac Zagreb
Croatian First League
Winner (1): 2015-16

References

External links
European competition
Stats

1980 births
Living people
Croatian male handball players
Croatian expatriate sportspeople in Spain
Croatian expatriate sportspeople in Germany
Croatian expatriate sportspeople in Slovenia
Croatian expatriate sportspeople in Romania 
Handball players from Zagreb
RK Zagreb players
RK Zamet players
Mediterranean Games silver medalists for Croatia
Competitors at the 2005 Mediterranean Games
Mediterranean Games medalists in handball